The Crown of Queen Mary is a consort crown that was made in 1911 for the British queen Mary of Teck. It forms part of the Crown Jewels of the United Kingdom.

Origin
Mary bought the Art Deco–inspired crown from Garrard & Co. out of her own pocket hoping it would become an heirloom worn by future queens consort. It is somewhat unusual for a British crown in that it has eight half-arches instead of the more typical four half-arches (two arches).

The silver-gilt crown has around 2,200 rose-cut and brilliant-cut diamonds, and originally contained the  Koh-i-Noor diamond, as well as the  Cullinan III and  Cullinan IV diamonds.

In 1914, those diamonds were replaced with crystal replicas, and the crown's arches were made detachable so it could be worn as an open crown. Mary wore it like this after her husband, George V, died in 1936. In 1937, the year of her son George VI's coronation, Cullinan V was added to the crown. Following her death in 1953 the crown was put on display at the Tower of London.

Queen Camilla
In February 2023, it was officially announced that Queen Camilla would be crowned using Queen Mary's Crown on 6 May 2023. Planned modifications include re-setting the crown with the original Cullinan III, IV and V diamonds, and removing four of its eight half-arches. The Koh-i-Noor is to remain in the Crown of Queen Elizabeth The Queen Mother.

Gallery

See also
Crown of Queen Adelaide
Crown of Queen Alexandra
Crown of Queen Elizabeth The Queen Mother

References

External links

Crown Jewels of the United Kingdom
Mary
Crown
1911 works